The Serbian Orthodox Eparchy of Western Europe is a Serbian Orthodox Church diocese in Western Europe. It has its headquarters in the 18th arrondissement of Paris. The church has parishes in Belgium, France, the Netherlands, and Spain. It also has two parishes in Portugal. Between 1997 and 2021, diocesan bishop was Luka Kovačević, who died in 2021. In May 2022, Justin (Jeremić) was elected new bishop.

See also

 Eastern Orthodoxy in France
 Eastern Orthodoxy in Spain
 Serbs in France
 Serbs in Spain

References

External links
 Diocese of France and Western Europe 
 Diocese of France and Western Europe  (Archives)
 Jubilee of the Diocese of Western Europe
 Serbian Orthodox Church in Netherlands 

Religious sees of the Serbian Orthodox Church
Serbian Orthodox Church in France
Serbian Orthodox Church in Spain
Eastern Orthodoxy in Portugal
Serbian Orthodox Church in Belgium
Serbian Orthodox Church in the Netherlands
Serbian Orthodox Church in Luxembourg
Eastern Orthodox dioceses in France